Ro48-8684 is a water-soluble benzodiazepine derivative developed by Hoffman-LaRoche in the 1990s, which was designed along with Ro48-6791 as an improved replacement for midazolam, but ultimately proved to have little advantages over the parent drug and has not been introduced into clinical practice.

See also 
Benzodiazepine

References 

Abandoned drugs
GABAA receptor positive allosteric modulators
Hoffmann-La Roche brands
Imidazobenzodiazepines
Lactams
Fluoroarenes
Oxazoles